The following lists events that happened during 2019 in Australia.

Incumbents

Monarch – Elizabeth II
Governor-General – Sir Peter Cosgrove (until 1 July), then David Hurley
Prime Minister – Scott Morrison
Deputy Prime Minister – Michael McCormack
Opposition Leader – Bill Shorten (until 30 May), then Anthony Albanese
Chief Justice – Susan Kiefel

State and Territory Leaders
Premier of New South Wales – Gladys Berejiklian
Opposition Leader – Michael Daley (until 25 March), then Penny Sharpe (until 29 June), then Jodi McKay
Premier of Queensland – Annastacia Palaszczuk
Opposition Leader – Deb Frecklington
Premier of South Australia – Steven Marshall
Opposition Leader – Peter Malinauskas
Premier of Tasmania – Will Hodgman
Opposition Leader – Rebecca White
Premier of Victoria – Daniel Andrews
Opposition Leader – Michael O'Brien
Premier of Western Australia – Mark McGowan
Opposition Leader – Mike Nahan (until 13 June), then Liza Harvey
Chief Minister of the Australian Capital Territory – Andrew Barr
Opposition Leader – Alistair Coe
Chief Minister of the Northern Territory – Michael Gunner
Opposition Leader – Gary Higgins

Governors and Administrators
Governor of New South Wales – David Hurley (until 1 May), then Margaret Beazley
Governor of Queensland –  Paul de Jersey
Governor of South Australia – Hieu Van Le
Governor of Tasmania – Kate Warner
Governor of Victoria – Linda Dessau
Governor of Western Australia – Kim Beazley
Administrator of the Australian Indian Ocean Territories – Natasha Griggs
Administrator of Norfolk Island – Eric Hutchinson
Administrator of the Northern Territory – Vicki O'Halloran

Events

January
 3 January – One man is killed and another is injured following a double stabbing at the Asia-Pacific headquarters of the Church of Scientology in the Sydney suburb of Chatswood.
 5 January – A far-right political rally held in Melbourne, marked by scuffles with police and counter-protesters, is attended by Independent Senator Fraser Anning, who admits to using tax-payer funded travel to attend the event.
7 January – A mass fish die-off occurs on the Lower Darling River at Menindee Lakes. Up to 1 million fish, including endangered species, ultimately die in what is described as possibly the largest fish die-off in Australian history.
 24 January – Professor Tanya Monro is appointed Australia's next Chief Defence Scientist, the first woman in the position.
29 January – The South Australian Murray Darling Basin Royal Commission report is released. The commission, which commenced in 2018, was critical of the Murray Darling Basin Plan and the Commonwealth Murray Darling Basin Authority.

February 
 Four people are killed and over a thousand people remain evacuated from homes in Townsville as flooding peaks in the city, following a metre of rainfall in the first week of the month. Among the dead were two men on 4 February, and two young boys on 25 February, all from drowning.
 4 February – The Royal Commission into Misconduct in the Banking, Superannuation and Financial Services Industry final report is tabled in Parliament. The report makes 76 recommendations.
12 February – The Liberal-National Coalition government becomes the first Australian federal government to lose a vote on its own legislation in 78 years, after a defeat on the floor of the House of Representatives. 
13 February – Nineteen homes are destroyed by bushfires in the New England and Northern Rivers regions of New South Wales.
26 February – Following the lifting of a suppression order, it is revealed that Cardinal George Pell had been convicted in December 2018 of sexually abusing two choirboys in 1996.

March 
13 March – Cardinal George Pell is sentenced to six years in prison following his conviction over the sexual abuse of two choirboys.
19 March – a few days prior to the state election, a video from September 2018 surfaced in which NSW Labor leader Michael Daley made comments about Asian immigration in Sydney. Daley said "Our young children will flee and who are they being replaced with? They are being replaced by young people from typically Asia with PhDs," and "So there's a transformation happening in Sydney now where our kids are moving out and foreigners are moving in and taking their jobs".
23 March – 
The Liberal-National Coalition government led by Gladys Berejiklian wins the 2019 New South Wales state election and returns to office with a reduced majority.
Tropical Cyclone Trevor makes landfall in the Northern Territory.

April 
11 April – Actor Geoffrey Rush is awarded $850,000 in damages after winning a defamation case against The Daily Telegraph.
12–14 April – After 25 years, Australia's Dirt n Dust Festival is held for the final time at Julia Creek, Queensland. Although scheduled for 2020 and 2021, those events were cancelled due to the COVID-19 pandemic. It was announced in 2021 that the festival had been permanently cancelled due to a lack of volunteers.

May 
16 May – Bob Hawke, Australia's 23rd Prime Minister, dies at the age of 89.
18 May – 2019 Australian federal election: Scott Morrison's Liberal/National Coalition Government is narrowly re-elected, defeating the Labor Party led by Bill Shorten.
26 May – The Sydney Metro is opened from Tallawong to Chatswood.
30 May – Anthony Albanese is elected unopposed as leader of the Australian Labor Party and Leader of the Opposition, replacing Bill Shorten. Richard Marles is elected deputy unopposed, succeeding Tanya Plibersek

June 
4 June – At least four men are killed and a woman is injured after a 45-year-old gunman allegedly goes on a shooting spree in the city centre of Darwin, Northern Territory.
4–5 June – The Australian Federal Police raid the home of News Corp Australia journalist Annika Smethurst and the headquarters of the ABC over national security and special forces stories.
24 June – Parts of the Darwin CBD are evacuated after the city is impacted by a 7.2 magnitude earthquake originating in Indonesia.

July
1 July – David Hurley is sworn in as the 27th Governor-General of Australia.
8–27 July – A biennial joint Australia-United States military exercise Talisman Saber 2019 is held.

August
13 August – 2019 Sydney stabbing attack
16 August – Pro-Hong Kong protesters clash with pro-China supporters in Melbourne, while police are forced to intervene during similar confrontations in Sydney and Adelaide, following the 2019–20 Hong Kong protests.
21 August – The Victorian Court of Appeal dismisses George Pell's appeal to overturn his conviction for child sex offences.
29 August – An attempt to deport the Sri Lankan Tamil Nadesalingam family asylum seekers was thwarted by a last-minute injunction, forcing the plane carrying the couple and their children out of Australia to land in Darwin.

September
9 September – Homes and buildings, including the historic Binna Burra Lodge, are destroyed by a bushfire in Queensland's Scenic Rim region.

October
26 October – Climbing Uluru is banned by authority of the Uluṟu-Kata Tjuṯa National Park board.
31 October – The Royal Commission into Aged Care Quality and Safety interim report is published and tabled in Parliament.

November
8 November – Three people are killed and 150 homes are destroyed by a large number of bushfires burning across New South Wales and South East Queensland.
11 November – A week-long State of Emergency is declared in New South Wales and the Australian Defence Force is put on alert amid mounting bushfire warnings.

December
30–31 December – Eight people are killed, hundreds of homes are destroyed and the Royal Australian Navy is mobilised to assist evacuation efforts following bushfires on the New South Wales South Coast and in Victoria's East Gippsland

Music, arts and literature

10 May – Tony Costa wins the Archibald Prize for his portrait of artist Lindy Lee.
 30 July – Melissa Lucashenko wins the Miles Franklin Award for Too Much Lip

Sport

January 
 5 January – Tennis: The Swiss team consisting of Roger Federer and Belinda Bencic defeat Germany 2–1 in the final of the 2018 Hopman Cup.
 26 January –
 Cricket: Brisbane Heat defeat Sydney Sixers by 3 wickets at Drummoyne Oval in Sydney in the final of the 2018–19 Women's Big Bash League season. 
 Tennis: Naomi Osaka defeats Petra Kvitová 7–6 (7–2), 5–7, 6–4 at Melbourne Park in the final of the 2019 Australian Open women's singles.
 27 January – Tennis: Novak Djokovic defeats Rafael Nadal 6–3, 6–2, 6–3 at Melbourne Park in the final of the 2019 Australian Open men's singles.

February
 15 February — 
 Rugby league: The Indigenous All Stars defeat the Māori All Stars 34–14 in the 2019 All Stars match. Indigenous halfback Tyrone Roberts, of the Gold Coast Titans, wins the Preston Campbell medal for Man of the Match.
 Rugby league: The Māori Women's All Stars defeat the Indigenous Women's All Stars 8–4 in the 2019 Women's All Stars match.
 16 February – 
 Association football: Sydney FC defeats Perth Glory 4–2 at Jubilee Oval, Sydney to win the 2019 W-League Grand Final.
 Basketball: Canberra Capitals defeat Adelaide Lightning 93–73 to win the 2018–19 WNBL series in the third game of the grand final series at AIS Arena in Canberra.
 17 February – 
 Cricket: Melbourne Renegades defeat Melbourne Stars by 13 runs to win the 2018–19 Big Bash League season.
 Rugby league: 2018 NRL premiers Sydney Roosters defeat Super League XXIII champions Wigan Warriors 20–8 in the 2019 World Club Challenge, held at DW Stadium in Wigan.

March
 17 March – 
 Basketball: Perth Wildcats defeat Melbourne United 97–82 to win the 2018–19 NBL series in the fourth game of the grand final series at Melbourne Arena.
 Motorsport: Mercedes driver Valtteri Bottas wins the 2019 Australian Grand Prix at Albert Park in Melbourne from Mercedes teammate Lewis Hamilton and Red Bull's Max Verstappen.
31 March – Australian rules football: Adelaide wins the 2019 AFL Women's Grand Final, defeating Carlton 10.3 (63) to 2.6 (18).

May
 19 May – 
 Association Football: Sydney FC defeat Perth Glory 0(4) to 0 (1) on penalties to claim the 2018-19 A-League season at Perth's Optus Stadium. It's a 4th A League title win for Sydney FC.

June
5 June – Rugby league: Queensland defeat New South Wales 18–14 at Suncorp Stadium in the first match of the 2019 State of Origin series. Queensland winger Dane Gagai is awarded man of the match.
23 June –
Golf: Hannah Green wins the 2019 Women's PGA Championship.
Tennis: Ashleigh Barty wins the 2019 Birmingham Classic, becoming the No. 1 ranked WTA tennis player.
Rugby league: New South Wales defeat Queensland 38–6 at Optus Stadium in the second match of the 2019 State of Origin series. NSW prop Jake Trbojevic is awarded man of the match.
24 June – Surfing: Sally Fitzgibbons is ranked No. 1 in women's surfing after winning the Rio Pro in Brazil.

July
10 July – Rugby league: New South Wales win the 2019 State of Origin series, defeating Queensland 26–20 at ANZ Stadium in the third match. NSW fullback James Tedesco is awarded both man of the match and the Wally Lewis Medal for player of the series.

August
29 August 2019 - Rugby league: After 25 seasons, the final NRL game is played at Willows Sports Complex in Townsville when more than 15,000 spectators watch the North Queensland Cowboys beat the Canterbury Bankstown Bulldogs.

September
8 September – Rugby league: Melbourne Storm win the minor premiership following the final main round of the 2019 NRL season. Gold Coast Titans finish in last position, claiming the wooden spoon.
9 September – Cricket: At Old Trafford, Australia defeats England in the fourth Test of the 2019 Ashes series thereby retaining The Ashes.
28 September – Australian rules football: Richmond defeats Greater Western Sydney 17.12 (114) to 3.7 (25), winning the 2019 AFL Grand Final.
29 September – Surfing: Mitch Parkinson wins the So Sri Lanka Pro 2019 as a part of the World Surf League, his first career WSL title.

October
6 October –
 Rugby league: Sydney Roosters defeat Canberra Raiders 14–8 to win the 2019 NRL Grand Final at ANZ Stadium, becoming the first team since 1992/1993 to win back to back rugby league titles. Raiders five-eighth Jack Wighton is awarded the Clive Churchill Medal for Man of the Match. Pre-match entertainment is headlined by American pop rock band OneRepublic, featuring Thandi Phoenix, while Daryl Braithwaite performs at halftime.
 Rugby league: Brisbane Broncos defeat St. George Illawarra Dragons 30–6 in the NRL Women's Premiership Grand Final, winning the title for the second year in a row.

November
5 November – Horse racing: Vow And Declare wins the 2019 Melbourne Cup.

Deaths

January 

 1 January – Paul Neville, Queensland politician (b. 1940)
 2 January – Darius Perkins, actor (b. 1964)
 4 January – John Thornett, rugby union player (b. 1935)
 6 January – Annalise Braakensiek, model (b. 1972)
 7 January – Jimmy Hannan, television presenter (b. 1934)
 8 January – Sir William Cole, public servant (b. 1926)
 16 January – Chris Wilson, blues musician (b. 1956)
 17 January – Tara Simmons, musician (b. 1984)
 19 January – Robert Furlonger, diplomat and public servant (b. 1921)
 20 January – Fred Castledine, Australian rules footballer (b. 1937)
 22 January – Eileen Massey, cricketer (b. 1935)
 24 January – Jim McCabe, Victorian politician (b. 1922)
 29 January – Ian George, Anglican bishop (b. 1934)
 30 January
 Maureen Brunt, economist (b. 1928)
 Alan Hayes, Australian rules footballer (Richmond) (b. 1939)

February 

 1 February – Andrew McGahan, novelist (b. 1966)
 3 February 
 Carmen Duncan, actor (b. 1942)
 John Sinclair, conservationist (b. 1939)
 9 February – Barney Cooney, Victorian politician (b. 1934)
 11 February – Jeffrey Miles, Australian Capital Territory Supreme Court Chief Justice (b. 1935)
 13 February – Leonard Casley, self-proclaimed monarch of the Principality of Hutt River (b. 1925)
 21 February – Sir Rupert Myers, metallurgist and university administrator (b. 1921)
 24 February 
 Paul Blackwell, actor (b. 1954)
 Philip Cummins, Victorian Supreme Court judge (b. 1939)
 Dame Margaret Scott, ballet dancer (b. 1922)
 25 February – John Herron, Queensland politician and diplomat (b. 1932)
 27 February
 Bill Landeryou, Victorian politician and union official (b. 1941)
 Milton Morris, New South Wales politician (b. 1924)
 28 February – Bruce Rosier, Anglican bishop (b. 1928)

March 

 1 March – Mike Willesee, television journalist (b. 1942)
 3 March – Richard Lewis, Western Australian politician (b. 1939)
 4 March – Les Carlyon, newspaper editor (b. 1942)
 10 March – Gordon McIntosh, Western Australian politician (b. 1925)
 11 March – Desmond Ford, theologian (b. 1929)
 13 March – Edmund Capon, art historian (died in the United Kingdom) (b. 1940)
 18 March – Giovanni Sgro, Victorian politician (b. 1931)
 19 March
 Lance Oswald, Australian rules footballer (St Kilda) (b. 1937)
 Ian Thorogood, Australian rules footballer (Carlton) and coach (b. 1936)
 Kenneth To, swimmer (b. 1992)
 20 March – Noel Hush, chemist (b. 1924)
 22 March – Jack Absalom, artist, author and adventurer (b. 1927)
 24 March – Vicky Kippin, Queensland politician (b. 1942)
 25 March – Stylianos Harkianakis, Greek Orthodox Archbishop of Australia (b. 1935)
 27 March – Bruce Yardley, Test cricketer (b. 1947)
 30 March – Geoff Harvey, musician and television personality (b. 1935)
 31 March – Peter Coleman, 30th New South Wales Leader of the Opposition (b. 1928)

April 

 1 April – Bill Butchart, middle-distance runner (b. 1933)
 4 April – John Winneke, Victorian Supreme Court judge (b. 1938)
 6 April – Lloyd McDermott, barrister and rugby union player (b. 1939)
 7 April
 Peter Armstrong, rugby league footballer (b. 1936)
 Joe Bertony, spy and engineer (b. 1922)
 9 April – Rod Galt, Australian rules footballer (St Kilda, Carlton) (b. 1951)
 11 April
 Lewis Cooper, cricketer (b. 1937)
 Peter Smedley, businessman (b. 1943)
 13 April
 Ron Austin, LGBT rights activist (b. 1929)
 Wally Carr, boxer (b. 1954)
 Michael Coper, legal scholar (b. 1946)
 15 April – Rex Harry, cricketer (b. 1936)
 16 April – Suzanne Twelftree, Paralympic wheelchair tennis player and powerlifter (b. 1956)
 18 April – Andrew Mallard, wrongfully convicted ex-convict (died in the United States) (b. 1962)
 20 April – Joyce Evans, photographer (b. 1929)
 23 April – Scott W. Sloan, civil engineer and academic (b. 1954)
 26 April – Eric Kent, Victorian politician (b. 1919)
 29 April – Les Murray, poet (b. 1938)
 30 April – Max Evans, Western Australian politician (b. 1930)

May 

 1 May – Sir Arvi Parbo, businessman (b. 1926)
 2 May – Mike Williamson, sports commentator (b. 1928)
 3 May – Enrico Taglietti, architect (b. 1926)
 4 May – Adam Sky, DJ (b. 1976)
 12 May – Alan Grover, Olympic rowing coxswain (b. 1944)
 14 May – Barbara York Main, arachnologist (b. 1929)
 16 May
 David Cervinski, soccer player (b. 1970)
 Bob Hawke, 23rd Prime Minister of Australia and President of the ACTU (b. 1929)
 19 May – John Millett, poet (b. 1921)
 20 May – Peter Hitchcock, environmentalist (b. 1944)
 21 May
 Lawrence Carroll, painter (died in the United States) (b. 1954)
 Densey Clyne, naturalist (b. 1922)
 Brian Kann, Australian rules footballer (Hawthorn) (b. 1933)
 Peter Schulze, Tasmanian politician (b. 1935)
 24 May – Alan Murray, golfer (b. 1940)
 25 May – Jean Burns, aviatrix (b. 1919)
 26 May – Kath Venn, Tasmanian politician (b. 1926)
 27 May – Judith McKenzie, archaeologist (b. 1957)
 28 May – Nick Yakich, rugby league footballer (b. 1940)
 30 May – Allan Edwards, cricketer (b. 1921)

June 

 1 June – Christobel Mattingley, writer (b. 1931)
 4 June
 Roger Covell, musicologist (b. 1931)
 Max Kay, entertainer and manager (b. 1936)
 5 June
 Stan Smith, Australian rules footballer (Collingwood) (b. 1925)
 Peter Toogood, golfer (b. 1930)
 8 June
 John Causby, cricketer (b. 1942)
 Bob Henderson, Australian rules footballer (Fitzroy) (b. 1934)
 12 June – Don Benson, Australian rules footballer (Richmond) (b. 1920)
 13 June – Anne Hamilton-Byrne, cult leader of The Family (b. 1921)
 15 June – John Wilson, Australian rules footballer (Richmond) (b. 1940)
 18 June – Alf Hughes, Australian rules footballer (Hawthorn) (b. 1930)
 19 June – Christine Barnetson, swimmer (b. 1948)
 20 June
 Bill Collins, film critic (b. 1934)
 Noel White, rugby league footballer (b. 1923)
 21 June
 Lindsay Drake, rugby league footballer (b. 1950)
 John Vernon, Olympic high jumper (b. 1929)
 23 June
 John Kobelke, Western Australian politician (b. 1949)
 George Strickland, Western Australian politician (b. 1942)
 24 June – Steve Dunleavy, journalist (died in the United States) (b. 1938)
 25 June
 Mack Atkins, Australian rules footballer (Hawthorn) (b. 1931)
 Bryan Marshall, actor (b. 1938)
 26 June – Ian Johnson, television executive (b. 1949)
 28 June – Brian Rhodes, cricketer (b. 1951)
 30 June – Doug Ford, cricketer (b. 1928)

July 

 2 July – Bruce Wallrodt, Paralympic athlete (b. 1951)
 5 July 
 Dorothy Buckland-Fuller, sociologist and social activist (b. 1922)
 Neil Davey, public servant (b. 1922)
 Kevin Higgins, Australian rules footballer (Geelong, Fitzroy) (b. 1951)
 6 July
 Bill Casimaty, farmer (b. 1935)
 Peter Hamilton, Australian rules footballer (Melbourne) (b. 1956)
 John Waddington, Australian rules footballer (North Melbourne) (b. 1938)
 8 July
 Nick Garratt, rowing coach (b. 1947)
 Neil Oliver, Western Australian politician (b. 1933)
 10 July – Nino Randazzo, journalist and member of the Italian Senate (b. 1932)
 13 July
 Richard Carter, actor (b. 1953)
 Kerry Reed-Gilbert, poet, author, collector and Aboriginal rights activist (b. 1956)
 15 July – Doug Flett, songwriter (b. 1935)
 19 July – David Hunt, New South Wales Supreme Court judge (b. 1935)
 20 July – Peter McNamara, tennis player and coach (died in Germany) (b. 1955)
 21 July
 Laurie Hergenhan, literary scholar (b. 1931)
 Ann Moyal, historian (b. 1926)
 24 July – Margaret Fulton, cookbook writer (b. 1924)
 25 July – Bruce Webster, New South Wales politician and broadcaster (b. 1927)
 26 July – Graham Freudenberg, political speechwriter (b. 1934)
 28 July – Ian Drohan, Australian rules footballer (St Kilda) (b. 1932)
 29 July
 Doris Goddard, cabaret singer and actress (b. 1930)
 Sam Trimble, cricketer (b. 1934)
 31 July
 Barrington Pheloung, composer (b. 1954)
 John Scarlett, Australian rules footballer (Geelong, South Melbourne) (b. 1947)

August 

 1 August – Barrington Pheloung, composer (b. 1954)
 3 August – Damien Lovelock, musician (b. 1954)
 5 August – Russell Middlemiss, Australian rules footballer (Geelong) (b. 1929)
 6 August
 Mick Miller, police officer (b. 1926)
 George Whaley, actor and director (b. 1934)
 8 August – Malcolm T. Elliott, radio personality (b. 1946)
 9 August – Hendricus Vogels, Olympic cyclist (b. 1942)
 10 August – Jim Forbes, South Australian politician (b. 1923)
 11 August
 Bluey Adams, Australian rules footballer (Melbourne) (b. 1935)
 Ningali Lawford, actor (died in the United Kingdom) (b. 1967)
 14 August
 Polly Farmer, Australian rules footballer (Geelong) (b. 1935)
 Ben Unwin, actor (b. 1977)
 15 August – Glenn Tasker, President of Paralympics Australia (b. 1951)
 17 August – Ronald Gray, Olympic athlete (b. 1932)
 19 August
 John Matthews, New South Wales politician (b. 1928)
 Jan Ruff O'Herne, human rights activist, former "comfort woman" (b. 1923)
 20 August – Colin Beard, Australian rules footballer (South Fremantle, Richmond) (b. 1941)
 21 August – Norma Croker, Olympic athlete (b. 1934)
 22 August – Tim Fischer, 10th Deputy Prime Minister of Australia (b. 1946)
 23 August – Peter Moscatt, rugby league footballer (b. 1943)
 24 August – Tony Nichols, Anglican prelate (b. 1938)
 28 August – Max McDonald, Victorian politician (b. 1927)
 30 August – Elaine Darling, Queensland politician (b. 1936)
 31 August – Jane Mathews, Federal Court judge (b. 1940)

September 

 1 September – Alison Cheek, Episcopal priest (died in the United States) (b. 1927)
 3 September
 David Evans, Western Australian politician (b. 1924)
 Tony Thiessen, Australian rules footballer (Melbourne, Carlton, North Melbourne) (b. 1942)
 6 September – Susan Irvine, author and educator (b. 1928)
 8 September – Paul Lyons, Olympic taekwondo practitioner (b. 1969)
 9 September – Danny Frawley, Australian rules footballer (St Kilda) and coach (Richmond) (b. 1963)
 10 September – Hal Colebatch, author (b. 1945)
 11 September – Penny Whetton, climatologist (b. 1958)
 13 September
 Paul Cronin, actor (b. 1938)
 Charles Henderson, weightlifter (b. 1922)
 16 September – Peter Lucas, Australian rules footballer (Collingwood) (b. 1929)
 17 September – Robert Oatey, Australian rules footballer (b. 1942)
 20 September – Jim Macken, lawyer, judge and human rights activist (b. 1927)
 21 September – David Combe, political lobbyist (b. 1943)
 23 September – Tauto Sansbury, Indigenous activist (b. 1949)
 26 September – Martin Wesley-Smith, composer (b. 1945)
 29 September – John D'Arcy, Australian rules footballer (Richmond) (b. 1935)
 30 September – Tom Allsop, Australian rules footballer (Hawthorn) (b. 1929)

October
 1 October – Richard Scotton, health economist (b. 1930)
 2 October – Robert Hickman, Australian rules footballer (Richmond) (b. 1942)
 4 October – Bryce Gaudry, New South Wales politician (b. 1942)
 6 October
 Neale Lavis, equestrian (b. 1930)
 Eddie Lumsden, rugby league footballer (b. 1936)
 8 October
 John Bennett, Tasmanian politician (b. 1942)
 Louis Waller, legal scholar (b. 1935)
 Reg Watson, television producer and screenwriter (b. 1926)
 9 October – John Williams, Australian rules footballer (Carlton) (b. 1940)
 11 October – Richard Tracey, Federal Court judge and military officer (died in the United States) (b. 1948)
 14 October – Patrick Ward, actor (b. 1950)
 21 October – Peter Hobbs, musician (b. 1961)
 22 October – Garry Koehler, singer-songwriter (b. 1955)
 27 October
 Ivan Milat, convicted serial killer (b. 1944)
 Anne Phelan, actress (b. 1948)
 30 October 
 Beatrice Faust, co-founder of Women's Electoral Lobby and author (b. 1939)
 Paul Whelan, New South Wales politician (b. 1943)

November

 5 November
 Kevin Hogan, broadcaster and Australian rules footballer (South Melbourne) (b. 1934)
 Robert Smithies, rugby league footballer (Hull Kingston Rovers, Balmain) (b. 1934)
 6 November
 John Curro, conductor (b. 1932)
 Clive Minton, ornithologist (b. 1934)
 9 November
 Dwight Ritchie, boxer (b. 1992)
 Mehmet Tillem, Victorian politician (b. 1974)
 13 November
 Stephen Albert, actor and singer (b. 1950)
 Kieran Modra, Paralympic cyclist (b. 1972)
 15 November
 Tony Mann, cricketer (b. 1945)
 Ray Preston, rugby league footballer (Newtown Jets) (b. 1929)
 17 November
 Ben Humphreys, Queenslander politician (b. 1934)
 John Wegner, opera singer (b. 1950)
 19 November
 John Abel, New South Wales politician (b. 1939)
 Colin Tatz, historian (b. 1934)
 22 November
 Tony Bull, Australian rules footballer (Melbourne) (b. 1930)
 Bill Waterhouse, bookmaker (b. 1922)
 23 November – Terry Board, Australian rules footballer (Carlton) (b. 1945)
 24 November
 J. Bruce Jacobs, academic (b. 1943)
 Clive James, writer and broadcaster (died in the United Kingdom) (b. 1939)
 25 November – Tsebin Tchen, Victorian politician (b. 1941)
 26 November – Ken Kavanagh, motorcycle racer (died in Italy) (b. 1923)
 27 November
 Martin Armiger, musician, record producer and composer (b. 1949)
 Sam Watson, activist, politician and writer (b. 1952)
 28 November – Graham Crouch, athlete (died in Germany) (b. 1948)
 30 November – Doug Cox, Australian rules footballer (St Kilda) (b. 1957)

December

 1 December – Stuart Fraser, musician
 2 December – Greedy Smith, musician (b. 1956)
 5 December – Don Howell, Australian rules footballer (St Kilda, Collingwood) (b. 1935)
 9 December – Paddy Guinane, Australian rules footballer (Richmond) (b. 1939)
 10 December – Bill Welsh, Australian rules footballer (Collingwood) (b. 1924)
 13 December – Graham Cooper, Australian rules footballer (Hawthorn) (b. 1938)
 14 December – Ken Wright, Victorian politician (b. 1925)
 15 December – Alfred Dennis, New South Wales politician (b. 1924)
 18 December – Doug Ricketson, rugby league footballer (b. 1930)
 20 December – Robert Moir, medical researcher (died in the United States) (b. 1961)
 21 December – Ron Penny, immunologist (b. 1936)
 23 December – John Cain Jr., 41st Premier of Victoria (b. 1931)
 29 December – M. C. Ricklefs, indonesianist (b. 1943)
 30 December – Horst Kwech, racecar driver (died in the United States) (b. 1937)

See also

 2019 Australian federal election
 2019 in Australian television
 List of Australian films of 2019

References

 
Years of the 21st century in Australia
Australia
2010s in Australia
Australia